Mount Eolus is  a high mountain summit of the Needle Mountains range of the Rocky Mountains of North America.

Named after the Greek god of the wind, the mountain was originally referred to as "Aeolus" in the 1874 Hayden Survey. The current spelling of "Eolus" was first used in the Wheeler Survey of 1878.

Climbing
Mount Eolus is one of three fourteeners in the Needle Mountains; the others are Sunlight Peak and Windom Peak. All three peaks are located around the cirque known as Upper Chicago Basin. Eolus lies to the west of the upper basin, while the other peaks lie on the east side. These mountains are among the most remote of Colorado's fourteeners and have a strong wilderness character.

North Eolus, elevation , is a northern subpeak of Mount Eolus, though it is not usually counted as a separate peak or as an official fourteener, since it has a topographic prominence of only . It is sometimes climbed in conjunction with Eolus.

See also
List of mountain peaks of North America
List of mountain peaks of the United States
List of mountain peaks of Colorado
List of Colorado fourteeners

References

External links

 
Mount Eolus on Summitpost

Fourteeners of Colorado
Mountains of La Plata County, Colorado
Mount Eolus
Mount Eolus
North American 4000 m summits
Mountains of Colorado